Stratford Old Town railway station was a railway station that served the town of Stratford-upon-Avon in Warwickshire, England. On the Stratford-upon-Avon and Midland Junction Railway, the station was built in 1873, adjacent to the Old Town district, south of the town centre.

History
Opened on 1 July 1873, along with the other stations on the line, the station lasted less than a century: the last scheduled passenger train ran on 7 April 1952, although there was one train carrying the Queen Mother to Stratford in 1964. The line remained open for freight until 1965.

Remains
The A4390 bypass road was built over the route of the railway since closure. However one platform of the old station was retained and is still visible by the roadside.

Routes

References

External links
 Stratford Old Town on navigable 1954 O. S. map
 The station on Warwickshire Railways

Disused railway stations in Warwickshire
Former Stratford-upon-Avon and Midland Junction Railway stations
Railway stations in Great Britain opened in 1873
Railway stations in Great Britain closed in 1952